North Western University (NWU), established in 2012, is the first private university of Khulna, Bangladesh. It offers bachelor's degrees in ten subjects and master's degrees in six. One of the founders of the university was Talukder Abdul Khaleque, Bangladesh Awami League politician.

History
North Western University, Khulna the first full-fledged private university in Khulna, university was established on 18 November 2012. The University Started Academic Activities from Spring Semester, 2013.

The Government of the People's Republic of Bangladesh approved the establishment of North Western University under Private University Act. 2010.

The university started its activities with 4 faculties, 12 departments, 67 full-time teachers, 61 part-time teachers and 489 students. At present the university consists of 4 faculties, 14 departments. The number of students and teachers have risen to about 5000 and 140 respectively.

The first fresh admission classes had 489 students enrolled in 12 Departments: Business Administration 62 students, BA Hons in English 9 students, MA in English 5 students, LLB 51 students, MBA-1 Year 27 students, EMBA 31 students, MBA-2 Year 11 students, MDS 7 students, Computer Science & Engineering 92 students, Electrical & Electronic Engineering 150 students, Civil Engineering 84 students.

Campus
The university is on 236, M.A Bari Road, Khulna 9100. It has two commercial buildings with one administrative buildings. 
Administration Building.
Engineering Building.

Programs
Faculty of Engineering
Bachelor of Science (BSc) - in 
Computer Science & Engineering (CSE)
Electrical & Electronic Engineering (EEE)
Electrical & Communication Engineering (ECE)
Civil Engineering (CE)

Business Studies
Business Studies
Bachelor of Business Administration (BBA)
Master of Business Administration (Regular-2 years) (MBA)
Master of Business Administration (Regular-1 year for BBA holders) (MBA)
Master of Business Administration for Executives (Regular-16 Months) (EMBA)

Arts & Human Science
Law
English

Social Science
MDS
Sociology
Bachelor of Social Science (BSS) in Sociology
Bachelor of Social Science (BSS) in Economics
Master of Social Science (MSS) in Economics
Master of Development Studies (MDS)

Semesters
The academic year of the university incorporates two regular semesters (Spring and Fall) and one short semester (Summer). The duration of each regular semester is 14/16 weeks and the duration of summer semester is 10/12 weeks.

Spring Semester: January to July
Fall Semester: July to December

Scholarship and waiver for undergraduate programs
100% tuition waiver – GPA Golden 5.00 in SSC & HSC/ Equi.

60% tuition waiver – GPA 5.00 in SSC& HSC/ Equi.

50% tuition waiver – GPA 4.90-<5.00 in SSC& HSC/ Equi.

30% tuition waiver – GPA 4.75-<4.90 in SSC& HSC/ Equi.

20% tuition waiver – GPA 4.50-<4.75 in SSC& HSC/ Equi.

10% tuition waiver – GPA 4.25-<4.00

10% tuition waiver for Diploma holder students.

But now here have no waiver .

References

External links 
 

Private universities in Bangladesh
Educational institutions established in 2012
2012 establishments in Bangladesh